Kyzyl-Yar (Qıźılyar) is a rural locality (a village) in Mesyagutovsky Selsoviet, Yanaulsky District, Bashkortostan, Russia. The population was 121 as of 2010. There are 4 streets.

Geography 
Kyzyl-Yar is located 48 km southeast of Yanaul (the district's administrative centre) by road. Stary Aldar is the nearest rural locality.

References 

Rural localities in Yanaulsky District